Etoile Sportive Prisse Macon is a French professional basketball team located in Prissé, France. The team currently competes in the NM2.

Some of the club’s players have represented their African national teams at the FIBA Africa Championship, making it quite well known worldwide.

Notable players
To appear in this section a player must have either:
 Set a club record or won an individual award as a professional player.
 Played at least one official international match for his senior national team or one NBA game at any time.
 Joris Bado 
 Nabil Bakkas

References

External links
Presentation at Eurobasket.com
Presentation at Facebook

Basketball teams in France
Sports teams in France
Basketball teams established in 1949
1949 establishments in France
Prissé